Yersinia similis is a Gram-negative bacteria species of Yersinia that resembles Yersinia pseudotuberculosis phenotypically but differs on the basis of 16S ribosomal RNA sequences. The type strain Y228 (=CCUG 52882 =DSM 18211 =LMG 23763) was originally isolated from a rabbit in Germany.

Etymology
Yersinia similis, L. fem. adj. similis, similar, resembling, as the strains are similar to those of Yersinia pseudotuberculosis.

References

External links
LPSN: Species Yersinia similis

similis
Bacteria described in 2005